The 2013 ICC Champions Trophy was the seventh ICC Champions Trophy, a One Day International cricket tournament held in England and Wales between 6 and 23 June 2013.

India won the competition, beating England by five runs in the final after overcoming South Africa, the West Indies and Pakistan in the group stage, followed by a semi-final victory over Sri Lanka. As winners, India earned $2 million in prize money, the largest amount since the tournament's inception. It was due to be the final ICC Champions Trophy, to be replaced by the ICC World Test Championship in 2017, but in January 2014, it was instead confirmed by the ICC that a Champions Trophy tournament would take place in 2017, with the proposed Test Championship being cancelled.

Rules and regulations
The 2013 ICC Champions Trophy was contested by eight teams, which were seeded and divided into two groups. Each team played every other team in its group once. Following the group stage, the top two teams from each group progressed to the semi-finals, where the winner of Group A played the runner-up of Group B and the winner of Group B played the runner-up of Group A.

Points system

Venues
Three cities hosted the tournament's matches: London (at The Oval), Birmingham (at Edgbaston) and Cardiff (at Sophia Gardens, known as Cardiff Wales Stadium for the tournament).

Squads

Warm-up matches
The warm-up matches had rules that were slightly different from normal ODI matches, so they are not recognised as ODIs. A team could use up to 15 players in a match, but only 11 could bat or field in each innings.

Group stage

Group A

 Advanced to knock-out stage

Group B

  Advanced to knock-out stage

Knock-out stage

Semi-finals

Final

Statistics

Batting
Most runs

Bowling
Most wickets

Controversy
Australian David Warner was suspended by Cricket Australia until the first Ashes Test after an altercation with English batsman Joe Root following Australia's loss to England.

Former England captain Bob Willis accused one English cricketer of tampering with the ball in order to aid reverse swing during their match against Sri Lanka. Umpire Aleem Dar changed the ball midway through Sri Lanka's innings, but England coach Ashley Giles denied the accusations, saying that Dar changed the ball because it had gone out of shape.

Pitch invasion incident
The semi-final between India and Sri Lanka at Sophia Gardens in Cardiff saw individuals, possibly Tamil Youth activists, running onto the pitch with flags of Tamil Eelam and banners protesting against the Sri Lankan team playing in the United Kingdom. The first invasion occurred in the 50th over of the Sri Lanka innings, but the two interlopers were soon overpowered by the security staff. However, the second invasion saw at least six protesters run onto the field from various angles from the River Taff End of the ground.

The protests continued after the match had finished, and a fight broke out outside the ground between protesters and supporters in a manner similar to the earlier protests at a group stage game at The Oval. Later, hundreds of members of Britain's Tamil community held up the Sri Lankan team bus after the encounter and raised anti-Sri Lankan government slogans. No protests were shown to the Indian team and their bus left as scheduled.

The earlier protest at The Oval allegedly saw several Tamils being harassed by Sinhala cricket fans who were leaving the match.

Team of the Tournament
The team of the tournament was announced by ICC on 28 June 2013. It was selected by a five-person selection panel that comprised Geoff Allardice (ICC General Manager – Cricket, and Chairman Event Technical Committee), Javagal Srinath (former India fast bowler and ICC Emirates Elite Panel match referee), Aleem Dar (ICC Emirates Elite Panel umpire), Scyld Berry (Wisden Editor from 2008-2011 and Sunday Telegraph correspondent) and Stephen Brenkley (correspondent of The Independent and Independent On Sunday).

Team of the Tournament (in batting order):
  Shikhar Dhawan
  Jonathan Trott
  Kumar Sangakkara
  Virat Kohli
  Misbah-ul-Haq
  Mahendra Singh Dhoni (c & wk)
  Ravindra Jadeja
  Ryan McLaren
  Bhuvneshwar Kumar
  James Anderson
  Mitchell McClenaghan
  Joe Root (12th man)

References

External links
 Official tournament site
 Tournament site on ESPN Cricinfo

 
ICC Champions Trophy tournaments
ICC Champions Trophy
ICC Champions Trophy
Champions Trophy